Too Young for Love (Italian: L'età dell'amore) is a 1953 French-Italian comedy drama film directed by Lionello De Felice and starring Aldo Fabrizi, Marina Vlady and Fernand Gravey. Some of the film was shot on location in Castellana Grotte.

Synopsis
In a small provincial Italian town, a fifteen-year-old boy meets and falls in love with a girl.

Partial cast
 Aldo Fabrizi as Coletti, padre di Annette  
 Marina Vlady as Annette  
 Pierre-Michel Beck as Andrea  
 Fernand Gravey as Padre di Andrea, presidente del tribunale  
 Vittorio Sanipoli as Sergio  
 Nando Bruno as Commisario  
 Lauro Gazzolo as Vicepresidente del tribunale  
 Lola Braccini as Zia di Sergio  
 Xenia Valderi as Madre di Andrea  
 Massimo Pianforini as Anselmo

References

Bibliography
 Adriano Pintaldi. Aldo Fabrizi: arte romana : al cinema e in cucina. Maggioli Editore, 2012.

External links

1953 films
1950s Italian-language films
Films directed by Lionello De Felice
Films scored by Mario Nascimbene
1953 comedy-drama films
Italian comedy-drama films
French comedy-drama films
French black-and-white films
Italian black-and-white films
1950s Italian films
1950s French films